Zagra may refer to:
 Zagra, Iran, a village in Ardabil Province, Iran
 Zagra, Granada
 Zagra, Bistrița-Năsăud, Romania
 Zagra River

See also